Religious Studies Review (RSR) is the journal of the Council of Societies for the Study of Religion (CSSR), which is based at Rice University. The journal is published quarterly by John Wiley & Sons. RSR reviews over 1,000 titles annually in review essays and critical notes.

History 
RSR was wholly produced and distributed by the Council till 2005 when they contracted Wiley-Blackwell to manage those. In 2009, Rice University purchased RSR, while Wiley-Blackwell continued the publishing duties.

References

External links
 Home of Religious Studies Review at The Religious Studies Department of Rice University
 CSSR Homepage

Religious studies journals
Rice University
Wiley-Blackwell academic journals